Meendum Kokila is a 1981 Indian Tamil-language romantic comedy film directed by G. N. Rangarajan from a screenplay written by Ananthu and story by Haasan Brothers. The film stars Kamal Haasan and Sridevi. Deepa,  M. Krishnamoorthy, Thengai Srinivasan and Omakuchi Narasimhan are featured in supporting roles. The film's narrative follows a young woman who fights to win back her husband after his infatuation with an actress.

Meendum Kokila was released theatrically on 14 January 1981. Upon its release, the film was a critical and commercial success. Sridevi's performance in the titular role was widely praised and is considered by various critics and film historians as one of the finest and most authentic portrayals of a TamilBrahmin woman. For her performance, Sridevi received the Filmfare Award for Best Actress-Tamil. The film was dubbed in Telugu as Chilipi Mogudu and released on 4 September 1981.

Plot 

Subramaniam, a lawyer is married to Kokila and has a daughter. Things go well until he meets Kamini, a movie star in a party. He gets attracted towards Kamini and becomes ready to sacrifice his own family for her. Kokila's efforts in bringing back her husband forms the rest of the story.

Cast 
 Kamal Haasan as Subramaniam
 Sridevi as Kokila
 Deepa as Kamini
 Suruli Rajan as Film Director
 S. N. Parvathy as Neighbour
 A. R. Srinivasan as Auditor
 "Nagesh" Krishnamurthy as Moorthy
 Baby Anju as Manju Subramaniam and Kokila's daughter
 Thengai Srinivasan as Nattuvanar
 T. K. S. Natarajan as Film Star

Production 
The film was originally directed by Mahendran with Sridevi, Kamal Haasan and Bollywood actress Rekha—in her Tamil cinema debut—playing the lead roles. Rekha was the original choice for the role of Kamini, and scenes featuring her were shot till 3000 feet. Initially Mahendran opted out of the film after a song sequence was shot. Later as the film progressed Rekha pulled out citing no reason. It was Haasan who requested G. N. Rangarajan to take over the film as director. Rekha's father Gemini Ganesan claimed he told her not to play "second fiddle" to Sridevi. Rekha was replaced by Deepa. Haasan's character in the film twitches his eye, for which he took inspiration from Krishnamachari Srikkanth.

Soundtrack 
The music was composed by Ilaiyaraaja. The song "Radha Radha Nee" is based on the Shuddha Saveri raga whereas "Chinnan Chiru Vayathil" is based on the Abheri raga. For the dubbed Telugu version Chilipi Mogudu, lyrics were written by Rajasri and Aarudra.

Tamil

Telugu (Chilipi Mogudu)

Reception 
Meendum Kokila opened to widespread success. Sridevi's performance was widely acclaimed and is considered by various critics and film commentators as one of the finest film performances of all-time. Sridevi received the Filmfare Award for Best Actress – Tamil; the first of her four Filmfare Awards. Just 17 years old, when released, the film's success consolidated Sridevi's position as the highest paid actress in South Indian cinema.

Re-release 
The film's digitally restored version was released on 15 December 2017.

References

External links 
 
 

1980s Tamil-language films
1981 films
1981 romantic comedy films
Films about adultery in India
Films directed by G. N. Rangarajan
Films scored by Ilaiyaraaja
Indian romantic comedy films